The 2013–14 Montreal Canadiens season was the 105th season of play for the franchise that was founded on December 4, 1909, and was their 97th season in the National Hockey League. The Montreal Canadiens defeated the Tampa Bay Lightning by sweeping them in the first round. They upset the top team in the NHL, the Boston Bruins, in a hard fought seven game series, before falling to the New York Rangers in the Eastern Conference Final in six games.

Standings

Schedule and results

Pre-season

Regular season

Playoffs

The Montreal Canadiens entered the playoffs as the Atlantic Division's third seed. They swept the Tampa Bay Lightning in the first round, and faced the Presidents' Trophy-winning Boston Bruins in the second round. They defeated the Bruins in a deciding Game 7 and advanced to the Eastern Conference Finals where they were eliminated by the New York Rangers in six games with their star goaltender Carey Price injured.

Player statistics
Final Stats
Skaters

Goaltenders

†Denotes player spent time with another team before joining the Canadiens. Stats reflect time with the Candadiens only.
‡Denotes player was traded mid-season. Stats reflect time with the Canadiens only.
Bold/italics denotes franchise record

Awards and honours

Milestones

Transactions 
The Canadiens have been involved in the following transactions during the 2013–14 season:

Trades

Free agents acquired

Free agents lost

Lost via retirement

Player signings

Draft picks

Montreal Canadiens' picks at the 2013 NHL Entry Draft, which was held in Newark, New Jersey on June 30, 2013.

Draft notes
 The Nashville Predators' second-round pick went to the Montreal Canadiens as a result of a February 27, 2012, trade that sent Andrei Kostitsyn to the Predators in exchange for a 2013 conditional fifth-round pick and this pick.
 The Calgary Flames' second-round pick went to the Montreal Canadiens as a result of a January 12, 2012, trade that sent Michael Cammalleri, Karri Ramo and a 2012 fifth-round pick (#124–Ryan Culkin) to the Flames in exchange for Rene Bourque, Patrick Holland and this pick.
 The Dallas Stars' third-round pick went to the Montreal Canadiens as a result of a February 26, 2013, trade that sent Erik Cole to the Stars in exchange for Michael Ryder and this pick.
 The Montreal Canadiens' fifth-round pick went to the Los Angeles Kings as the result of a trade on April 2, 2013, that sent Davis Drewiske to Montreal in exchange for this pick.
 The Montreal Canadiens' seventh-round pick went to the Florida Panthers as the result of a trade on June 30, 2013, that sent a seventh-round pick in 2014 to Montreal in exchange for this pick.

References

Montreal Canadiens seasons
Montreal Canadiens season, 2013-14
Montreal